Dayton is an unincorporated community in Colona Township, Henry County, Illinois, United States.

History
One of the oldest towns in the county, the town of Dayton was laid out in October 1836.  It was once a stop on the Chicago, Dixon and Rock Island stage route. The community most likely took its name after Dayton, Ohio.

Geography
The town is located in the northwest part of the county just south of Cleveland.

References

Unincorporated communities in Illinois
Unincorporated communities in Henry County, Illinois